Aleksandr Trofimov may refer to:
 Aleksandr Trofimov (actor) (born 1952), Soviet and Russian actor
 Aleksandr Trofimov (footballer) (born 1937), Soviet and Azerbaijani footballer
 Aleksandr Trofimov (diplomat) (born 1937), Russian diplomat